This is a list of elections in Canada in 2010. Included are provincial, municipal and federal elections, by-elections on any level, referendums and party leadership races at any level.

February
 4 February: Provincial by-election in Toronto Centre

March
 2 March: Provincial by-election in Concordia, Manitoba
 4 March: Provincial by-elections in Ottawa West—Nepean and Leeds—Grenville, Ontario

July
 5 July: Provincial by-election in Vachon, Quebec

September
 13 September: Provincial by-election in Saint-Laurent, Quebec
 27 September: 2010 New Brunswick general election

October
2 October: 2010 Prince Edward Island Progressive Conservative Party leadership election
18 October: 2010 Alberta municipal elections
25 October: 2010 Ontario municipal elections
27 October: 2010 Manitoba municipal elections

November
 1 November: 2010 Prince Edward Island municipal elections, in Charlottetown, Cornwall, Stratford and Summerside
3 November: Saskatchewan municipal elections for odd-numbered rural municipalities
29 November: Provincial by-election in Kamouraska-Témiscouata, Quebec
29 November: 2010 Canadian federal by-elections

December
 2 December: Provincial by-election in Conception Bay East - Bell Island, Newfoundland and Labrador
 6 December: Nunavut municipal elections, 2010 (hamlets)
 13 December: Mayoral by-election in Iqaluit, Nunavut
 13 December: Northwest Territories municipal elections, 2010 (hamlets)
 13 December: Territorial by-election in Whitehorse Centre, Yukon

References

See also
Municipal elections in Canada
Elections in Canada

 
Political timelines of the 2010s by year